The Wisconsin Badgers represented the University of Wisconsin in WCHA women's ice hockey during the 2014-15 NCAA Division I women's ice hockey season. The Badgers won the WCHA Tournament, and were one of the best teams in the nation, falling in the Frozen Four to their rivals, Minnesota.

Offseason
August 4: Current Wisconsin players Courtney Burke and Annie Pankowski were invited to the 2014 USA Hockey Women's National Festival in Lake Placid, New York. Outgoing senior Alex Rigsby was also invited. The festival shall determine the roster of the Under-22 team that shall compete in a three-game series versus the Canadian U22/Development Squad from Aug. 21-24 in Calgary.

Recruiting

2014–15 Badgers

Schedule

|-
!colspan=12 style=""| Regular Season

|-
!colspan=12 style=""| WCHA Tournament

|-
!colspan=12 style=""| NCAA Tournament

Awards and honors

Annie Pankowski, 2015 WCHA Rookie of the Year.
Emily Clark, 2015 WCHA ALL-ROOKIE TEAM
Annie Pankowski, 2015 WCHA ALL-ROOKIE TEAM

WCHA Weekly Honors
Annie Pankowski, WCHA Rookie of the Week (October 1, 2014)
Annie Pankowski, WCHA Rookie of the Week (Week of November 18, 2014) 
Annie Pankowski, WCHA Rookie of the Week (November 27, 2014)
Annie Pankowski, WCHA Rookie of the Week (January 27, 2015)
Emily Clark, WCHA Offensive Player of the Week, (Week of February 3, 2015)
Blayre Turnbull, WCHA Offensive Player of the Week, (Week of February 10, 2015)
Ann-Renee Desbiens, WCHA Defensive Player of the Week (Week of November 25, 2014) 
Ann-Renee Desbiens, WCHA Defensive Player of the Week, (Week of February 10, 2015) 2015)

References

Wisconsin
Wisconsin Badgers women's ice hockey seasons
NCAA women's ice hockey Frozen Four seasons
Wiscon
Wiscon